Independent Division of Inner Mongolian Military District(1st Formation) was formed on July 1, 1966 from the Public Security Contingent of Heilongjiang province. The division was composed of four regiments (5th to 8th) and two independent battalions.

On March 22, 1969 it moved to Tianjin and became Independent Division of Tianjin Security District() with its 6th, 7th and 8th Regiments. Its 5th Infantry Regiment was detached and transferred to 1st Independent Division of Hebei Provincial Military District.

In August 1976 the division was renamed as Security Division of Tianjin Security District(). Its 6th, 7th and 8th Regiments were renamed as 1st, 2nd and 3rd Security Regiments, respectively.

In March 1983 the division was transferred to People's Armed Police as Armed Police Contingent of Tianjin City.

References
中国各省军区独立师的历史沿革, http://www.360doc.com/content/13/1205/20/1164894_334784330.shtml

ST
Military units and formations established in 1966
Military units and formations disestablished in 1983
1966 establishments in China
1983 disestablishments in China